Jason Mark Oates (born 11 July 1974) is a former Zimbabwean cricketer. In first-class cricket, he played the final of the 1995–96 Logan Cup for Mashonaland Country Districts, one match for Mashonaland against Western Province in 1996, and two Logan Cup matches for Mashonaland A in 1997 and 1999, respectively.

References

External links
 
 

1974 births
Living people
Cricketers from Harare
Mashonaland cricketers
Mashonaland A cricketers
Zimbabwean cricketers